Jaheim H. Hoagland (born May 26, 1978), known mononymously as Jaheim, is an American R&B singer. He was signed by Naughty by Nature's Kaygee to Divine Mill Records in 2000, and released his debut album Ghetto Love in 2001. His second effort, Still Ghetto (2002), contains the hit singles "Put That Woman First" (2003) and "Fabulous" (2003), both of which achieved platinum success.

Jaheim's third album, Ghetto Classics, was released on February 14, 2006, debuting at number one on the U.S. Billboard 200, and selling over 153,000 copies in its first week.

Music career
Four years after he recorded a tape that led to a deal with Divine Mill Records (a division of Warner Bros. Records). Hoagland received good reactions from two singles "Could It Be" and "Lil' Nigga Ain't Mine" on BET video shows. Appearing with Hoagland on his first album was RL (from Next), Blackstreet, and Darren and Cliff Lighty.

His second album, Still Ghetto, was released on November 5, 2002. Another Top Ten hit, it placed two singles in the Top 40, "Fabulous" and "Anything" (released November 13, 2001). Ghetto Classics followed in early 2006 and became his first number one album. In 2007 Jaheim signed to Atlantic Records and released his fourth album The Makings of a Man in December 2007.

In late 2009 the single "Ain't Leavin Without You" preceded his 2010 album Another Round. In 2013 Jaheim returned to the music industry with a new single titled "Age Ain't a Factor" and a new album. His sixth album, Appreciation Day, was released on September 3, 2013. In 2014, Jaheim restarted his own label called "Julie's Dream Music Group", which had first been started in 1997, then restarted in 2002.

Following the relaunch of his label, in February 2015, Jaheim signed a new record deal with BMG Records after parting ways with Atlantic Records in conjunction with his Julie's Dream label. In June 2015, Jaheim released a new single called "Back in My Arms" and revealed that his seventh album, titled Struggle Love, is to be released. Struggle Love was released on March 18, 2016. To date Jaheim has sold 5 million records worldwide and received three Grammy nominations.

Personal life
Jaheim is a resident of Hillsborough Township, New Jersey. Jaheim is the grandson of the late 1960s soul singer Hoagy Lands.

In September 2021, he was arrested on animal cruelty charges after police discovered 15 dogs living in deplorable conditions at his New Jersey home. One of the dogs had to be euthanized.

Discography

Studio albums
 Ghetto Love (2001)
 Still Ghetto (2002)
 Ghetto Classics (2006)
 The Makings of a Man (2007)
 Another Round (2010)
 Appreciation Day (2013)
 Struggle Love (2016)

Compilations
 Classic Jaheim, Vol. 1 (2008)

Awards and nominations
American Music Award

|-
|2003
|
|Favorite Soul/R&B Male Artist
|
|}

Grammy Award

|-
|rowspan=3|2011
|Another Round
|Best R&B Album,
|
|-
|rowspan=2|"Finding My Way Back"
|Best Male R&B Vocal Performance
|
|-
|Best R&B Song
|
|}

Soul Train Music Awards

|-
|rowspan=2|2002
|"Just in Case"
|Best R&B/Soul Single, Male
|
|-
|Ghetto love
|Best R&B/Soul Album, Male
|
|-
|2003
|Still Ghetto
|Best R&B/Soul Album, Male
|
|-
|2004
|"Put That Woman First"
|Best R&B/Soul Single, Male
|
|-
|2010
|Himself
|Best Male R&B/Soul Artist
|
|}

References

External links
Official Site
MySpace Official
Jaheim French Fan Page – SoulRnB.com

1978 births
American contemporary R&B singers
American people of Cuban descent
American people who self-identify as being of Native American descent
Atlantic Records artists
Warner Records artists
Living people
People from Hillsborough Township, New Jersey
Musicians from New Brunswick, New Jersey
Singers from New Jersey
20th-century African-American male singers
21st-century American singers
21st-century American male singers
21st-century African-American male singers